The Shatter Me/Music Box 2014/2015 Tour is a worldwide concert tour by violinist Lindsey Stirling in support of her second studio album Shatter Me. The first tour dates were announced at the end of 2013 and the tour started on May 13 of the next year. The 2014 North and European American leg of Lindsey Stirling's tour consisted of her performing 77 shows over a five-month time span. For 2015, Stirling did 67 shows over five continents. Stirling toured around North America, Europe, Asia, Oceania, and South America, being her first time to present a show on this continent. In December 2014, it was confirmed that more than 200,000 people had attended Stirling's shows, more than half of those being in Europe.

Background
On December 18, 2013, Stirling announced on her website that in the next year she would be touring around North America. That same day, the first concert dates were announced. On April 4, 2014 Stirling posted via Twitter that AJR would be supporting her tour from June 16 to 12 July. On April 11 Stirling announced that Anže Škrube would choreograph her tour. That same day were the auditions for the dancers. On May 9, it was announced that Stephen Jones and Peter Styles were the two dancers chosen to be part of the tour. The tour started on May 13, 2014 in San Diego, two weeks after the release of her album.

On November 13, two weeks after the European Leg of the tour ended, Lindsey revealed that 100,177 people had attended her 26 shows in the European continent. In that same month, on November 24, Stirling added 5 dates more in North America in California, extending also the tour to the year 2015. Stephen Jones and Peter Styles were not a part of this leg of the tour. On December 9, it was announced by the media that Lindsey would tour around Australia and New Zealand in February 2015. Two days later Stirling herself announced the new official dates. On December 22, the media revealed that Stirling would be performing on Singapore on March 3 of the next year at The MasterCard Theatres at Marina Bay Sands. In December OF 2014, Stirling confirmed that more than 200,000 people had attended her 77 shows since the tour started. In February 2015, Stirling added her first shows at South America, the only continent where she had never performed before. Shows in Argentina were so successful that an additional date was added on April 16.

The tour has received different names through the months, the most used are the 'Lindsey Stirling Tour', and internationally 'Shatter Me Tour'. Lately, in North America the tour has been promoted under the name of 'Lindsey Stirling: The Music Box Tour'.

After touring in South America, Stirling decided to make changes on her crew by adding four new female dancers: Malece Miller, Amy Yakima, Addie Byers, and Ashley Gonzales, and getting some female tour openers such as Melanie Martinez, Echosmith (Sydney Sierota), Lights, and Olivia Somerlyn. A video was published on her behind-the scenes channel on May 14 announcing the new dancers.

Set list
The following set list is representative of the show in Boise, Idaho on May 26, 2015. It is not representative of all concerts for the duration of the tour.

 "Ascendance"
 "Electric Daisy Violin"
 "Moon Trance"
 "Master of Tides"
 "Shadows"
 "Elements"
 "Video game medley (Assassin's Creed, Dragon Age, Halo, Zelda, Skyrim)"
 "Song of the Caged Bird"
 "Swag"
 "Transcendance"
 "Take Flight"
 "Crystallize"
 "Firefly"
 "Roundtable Rival"
 "Stars Align"
 "Shatter Me"

 Encore
 "Beyond the Veil"

Reception
The Orange County Register said of her sold out performance at the City National Grove of Anaheim "Not only did Stirling bow away with flawless precision, whether on a classical model or a modern electric version, she also moved like Jagger and sometimes joined two dancers in choreographed routines while fluidly continuing to play." while Niagara Frontier Publications commented "Dancing violinist Lindsey Stirling is to music what Steve Jobs was to computers." In the web page HrTicket.com acclaimed Stirling's performance writing on an article: " You've seen violinists. You've seen dancers. Perhaps you've seen stage shows with spectacular lighting effects and elaborate costume changes. But you've never seen what YouTube sensation Lindsey Stirling is going to be doing in her sold-out show at The Norva in Norfolk on Thursday night." The author also gave the concert a review of four over five stars.

Tour dates

Personnel
Band
 Lindsey Stirling – violin
 Jason "Gavi" Gaviati – keyboards, samples
 Drew Steen – drums, percussion
 Kit Nolan – keyboards, guitar, samples

Dancers
 Malece Miller
 Amy Yakima
 Addie Byers
 Ashley Gonzales
 Stephen "Stevo" Jones
 Peter Styles

Choreographer
 Kyle Hanagami
 Anže Škrube

Guest vocalists
 Dia Frampton (May 13 – June 10)
 Lzzy Hale (May 15)

References

External links
Official website

2014 concert tours
2015 concert tours
Lindsey Stirling concert tours